The Deutschvölkischer Schutz- und Trutzbund (German Nationalist Protection and Defiance Federation) was the largest and the most active anti-Semitic federation in Germany after the First World War, and an organisation that formed a significant part of the völkisch movement during the Weimar Republic (1918-1933), whose democratic parliamentary system it unilaterally rejected. Its publishing arm issued books that greatly influenced the opinions of Nazi Party leaders such as Heinrich Himmler. After the organisation folded in around 1924, many of its members eventually joined the Nazis.

Origin
The Deutschvölkischer Schutz- und Trutzbund was originally called the Deutscher Schutz- und Trutzbund when it was founded in February 1919 in Bamberg for the purpose of "fighting" Judaism during a meeting of the Alldeutscher Verband ("All-German League"). The director of Deutscher Schutz- und Trutzbund was Alfred Roth, and its secret chairman was Konstantin von Gebsattel, who was appointed on 1 October 1919 by Ernst von Hertzberg Lottin. Its advisory board included Ernst Anton Franz von Bodelschwingh, Theodor Fritsch, August Gebhard, Paul Lucius, Ferdinand Werner, Julius Friedrich Lehmann and Georg von Stössel. Its meeting place was originally in Duisburg, in Alfred Roth's house, but was later moved to Hamburg, where it joined several such other organizations. It merged with the Reichshammerbund and about a month later with the Deutschvölkischer Bund, the organization that had succeeded the Deutschvölkische Partei.

Manifesto
The organisation's manifesto was Wenn ich der Kaiser wär ("If I Were the Kaiser"), which was written by All-German League President Heinrich Claß in which he expressed identitarian and nationalist views. His slogan was "Germany for the Germans". Julius Friedrich Lehmann, a Munich publisher, helped promote the organisation's ideas, and in October 1918, Claß called for a coup d'etat. The organisation agitated against the Weimar Republic, and by 1923, it had just under 180,000 members.

Symbols
The organisation used as its symbols a blue cornflower and a swastika. According to the British author Peter Padfield its motto was "Wir sind die Herren der Welt!" ("We are the masters of the world!"). However, not a single German source can be found that confirms the motto, which in fact is a verse from the song "Der mächtigste König im Luftrevier" ("The mightiest king in the skies"). According to the German historian Ulrich Sieg, the organization's motto was Deutschland den Deutschen ("Germany for the Germans").

Excerpt of constitution
Here is an excerpt from its constitution:
The Bund fights for the moral rebirth of the German people.... It considers the pernicious and destructive influence of Jewry to be the main cause of the defeat and the removal of this influence to be necessary for the political and economic recovery of Germany, and for the salvation of German culture.

Notable members

Herbert Albrecht
Karl Astel
Erich von dem Bach-Zelewski
Werner Best
Ernst Boepple
Philipp Bouhler
Walter Buch
Leonardo Conti
Heinrich Deubel
Artur Dinter
Oskar Dirlewanger
Dietrich Eckart
Friedrich Karl Florian
Theodor Fritsch
Wilhelm Grimm
Josef Grohé
Heinrich Haake
Ludolf Haase
Otto Hellmuth
Hans Helwig
Reinhard Heydrich, co-architect of the holocaust
Karl Kaufmann
Georg Joel
Josef Klant
Richard Kunze
J. F. Lehmann
Viktor Lutze
Walter Maass
Eugen Munder
Wilhelm Murr
Martin Mutschmann
Wilhelm Ohnesorge
Friedrich Ringshausen
Alfred Roth
Bernhard Rust
Fritz Sauckel
Franz Xaver Schwarz
Franz Schwede
Wolfram Sievers
Franz Walter Stahlecker
Julius Streicher
Ernst Werner Techow
Otto Telschow
Felix Wankel
Karl Weinrich

See also
Freikorps
Organisation Consul

References

Notes

Bibliography
Roth, Alfred. Aus der Kampfzeit des Deutschvölkischen Schutz-und-Trutzbundes. Hamburg, 1939
Waite, Robert G L. Vanguard of Nazism''. 1969, W W Norton and Company

External links
Article from the Historical Dictionary of Bavaria website
 Martin Ulmer:  “The Enemy is in the Country: The Jew.” Poster Stamps Printed by the Deutschvölkischen Schutz- und Trutz-Bundes (German Nationalist Protection and Defiance Federation), in: Key Documents of German-Jewish History, September 22, 2016.  

Antisemitism in Germany
Early Nazism (–1933)
Ethnic supremacy
German nationalist organizations
Organizations based in the Weimar Republic